Leps or LEPS may refer to:

 Adrien L. J. Leps (1893–?), French World War I flying ace
 Ergas Leps (born 1939), Canadian middle-distance runner
 Grigory Leps (born 1962), Russian singer-songwriter
 Wassili Leps (1870–1942), Russian-born American composer and conductor
 Leps, Saxony-Anhalt, Germany, a village and former municipality
  Laser Electron Photon Experiment at SPring-8 (LEPS), a physics experiment
 Butterflies and moths, collectively known as Lepidoptera

See also
 LEP (disambiguation)